Wise After the Event is the second studio album by English musician and composer Anthony Phillips, released in May 1978 on Arista Records in the United Kingdom and in June 1978 on Passport Records in the United States. After promoting his previous album The Geese & the Ghost (1977), Phillips began to prepare material for a new album. It remains his only album that features himself on lead vocals on each track.

Production
In March 1977, Phillips released his debut solo album, The Geese & the Ghost. Around the time it was put out, Phillips did consider furthering his education and return to music college but the album "did enough" for him to continue with making albums. Phillips recalled that the rise in punk rock in England at the time of The Geese & the Ghost increased the pressure for him to write more commercial songs and deliver hit singles. He had started an instrumental album based on Tarka the Otter, but the project was put on hold due to his difficulty in securing a recording deal. Within such a climate, Phillips found himself "forced" to make a new studio album of "mainstream pop songs" which he never felt completely comfortable doing, and lacked enough confidence in the material he had written by himself. He began with putting ideas down at his home studio using a TEAC 4-track tape machine and a 2-track Revox recorder.

After preparing a collection of ideas Phillips presented them to producer Rupert Hine and session musicians Michael Giles on drums and John G. Perry on bass, the three rehearsed them for one week at Giles's home studio in Dorset, and recorded the developed tracks onto 4-track tape. After Phillips secured a deal with Arista Records, the original plan was for Wise After the Event to be released as an album with an accompanying EP of extra material. Artist Peter Cross began to design the cover art when the decision was made, but when the decision was made to scrap the EP Cross had moved onto other projects and there was insufficient time to correct his design, resulting in discrepancies with the running order of the tracks. This was corrected on the 1990 CD reissue.

The unreleased music was released in 1980 on Phillips's next album Private Parts & Pieces II: Back to the Pavilion, the second in his series of "generic" albums that showcase ideas, demos, and outtakes of recordings. These included three short sections of tracks that were planned and sequenced for the earlier album: "Chinaman" is based on the introduction to "Paperchase"; "Romany's Aria" is a piece from "We're All as We Lie" played backwards; "Von Runkel's Yorker Music" was previously titled "Sitars and Nebulous". Back to the Pavilion includes two additional songs, "Tremulous" and "Magic Garden", that date from the Wise After the Event sessions.

Recording
Wise After the Event was recorded from October to December 1977. The first sessions took place across two weeks in October at Essex Studios in London, using a 16-track machine with added Dolby noise reduction. These were followed by sessions in November and December on the Manor Mobile studio and The Farmyard, a facility in Buckinghamshire. Here, the final takes of the backing tracks were recorded and transferred onto 24-track for the recording of the overdubs. The final sessions took place in December 1977 at CBS Studios in London. After recording finished, the album was mixed in December 1977 and January 1978 at Trident Studios in London. Minor overdubs were recorded at the studio, including the guitar solo on "Birdsong". The orchestra session for "Regrets" took place on 6 December 1977, and recorded onto 24-track.

"Wise After the Event" features Phillips playing a 12-string Rickenbacker guitar that he purchased at Manny's Music in New York City. For the guitar effects he used a BOSS Chorus Esemble pedal and a Dyna Comp compressor for chord-based arrangements. He said it took some effort for Giles to "let himself go" on the drums as he was used to playing in a tight and precise style, and Phillips wanted more of his fast drum fills. Phillips is credited for playing the drums on Wise After the Event, and caused problems during the recording as he found himself gradually speeding up as he played. Giles advised him to practise at home for a weekend and play to a metronome to improve his timing.

Release and reception

Wise After the Event was released in May 1978 on Arista Records in the United Kingdom and in June 1978 on Passport Records in the United States. "We're All as We Lie" was released as a single with "Squirrel" and "Sitars and Nebulous" coupled on the B-side. "Squirrel" was later reunited with the album as a bonus track on the 1990 reissue.

The British magazine Hi-Fi News & Record Review wrote: "Soft strums, songs and keyboard waves typify" the album which has "a mild Mike Oldfield touch to it" which "augurs well for its chances". One reviewer for Beat magazine in 1979 put the record on as it was "the perfect soother of frazzled nerves". Rob Patterson for The Bismarck Tribune gave a short positive review, noting the album is "a soft, subtle, but very tasteful slice of that-now-famous [Genesis] sound", and concludes with: "A heartening return". Chris Carson for the Press & Sun-Bulletin thought the album was not as successful as The Geese & the Ghost where Phillips "had the right idea" to play the instruments himself and leave the vocals to others. Carson compared the album's sound to early Genesis when Phillips was a member, but disliked his singing which failed to reach the quality of the album's production guitar work. "The result is a very tedious album, and a real struggle for even the devout Genesis fan to get through". Jane Seigendall for The Morning Call opened her review that the album is "an extraordinary example of music that's hard to just listen to", and requires the listener to "enter it" to appreciate the "haunting" music with his "erudite and often surrealistic" words that she found difficult to understand. She recognises his classical influences which is simultaneously "futuristic and ageless" and cites "We're All as We Lie" as the best example of his unconventional style, and suggested the album will appeal to esoteric music fans. She ended by praising Cross's artwork. The Times of Munster, Indiana rated the album as one of the best progressive rock albums of 1978 and is "most worthy of your listening time". It praised the contributions of Giles and Collins, and concludes: "The album simply shimmers with Phillips's delicate tunes". In a retrospective review, Dave Thompson for AllMusic gave the album four stars out of five. He recognised the album was made during "an invigorating period" for Phillips and noted his increased confidence "oozes out of every groove". Thompson rated Wise After the Event as more cohesive than The Geese & the Ghost but lacks the experimental nature of his predecessor and considered it to have too many ballads and "samey" music. He praises "We're All as We Lie" and the "multi-textured" title track as "career-enhancing classics".

Reissues
In 1990, Wise After the Event was released on CD by Virgin Records, with "Squirrel" as a bonus track. This was followed by a 2-CD remastered edition released in July 2007 in Japan by Arcangelo Records with a limited edition mini-vinyl sleeve. Included is "Squirrel" and a disc of 14 previously unreleased tracks of demos and out-takes. A standard CD jewel case version was released in the UK by Voiceprint Records in May 2008.

In February 2016, Esoteric Recordings released a 4-disc Deluxe Edition of the album with a new stereo mix completed in 2016, a second CD containing the same bonus material as the 2008 Voiceprint release, and a third CD with a remastered version of the original stereo mix. The fourth disc is a DVD containing a new 5.1 surround sound. All mixes were completed using the original multi-track master tapes. Also included is a poster and a 20-page booklet with photos and extensive liner notes. Phillips did consider going back to the original concept and present it with an accompanying EP and with the originally planned track order, but decided against it with the idea of inserting links of music as people would have got used to how the album was released.

Track listing
All songs written by Anthony Phillips, except where indicated.

Personnel
Credits adapted from the album's 1978 and 2015 liner notes.

Music
Anthony Phillips (aka "The Vicar", "Vic Stench") – vocals, harmonia, guitars, keyboards, sundries, drums and bass on "Greenhouse", orchestral arrangements on "Regrets"
Michael Giles – drums
John G. Perry – Wal custom bass guitar
Jeremy Gilbert – keyboards on "Greenhouse", harp on "Now What? (Are They Doing to My Little Friends?)"
Mel Collins – soprano saxophone on "We're All as We Lie", flute on "Birdsong"
Robin Phillips – oboe on "Sitars & Nebulous"
Rupert Hine (aka "Humbert Ruse") – percussion, backing vocals, locks, probs, modes, vibraphone, drums and bass on "Greenhouse"
Alan Perkins (aka "Perkin Alanbeck") – synthesiser on "Birdsong"
Rodent Rabble – clicks, claps and crampons (including "No Hours from Neasden")
Gilbert Biberian – orchestra conductor on "Regrets"
David Katz – orchestra assembling

Production
Rupert Hine – producer
Richard "Papercup" Austen – engineer at Essex Studios
Alan Perkins – engineer at Manor Mobile and Twowood Studios
Steve Taylor – engineer at CBS Studios
George Marino – mastering at Sterling Sound
Ray Staff – mastering at Trident Studios
Peter Kelsey – mixing
Simon Heyworth – remastering
Peter Cross – artwork

References 

Sources

External links
 Anthony Phillips site

1978 albums
Albums produced by Rupert Hine
Anthony Phillips albums
Passport Records albums
Arista Records albums